Mackenzi Lee (born Mackenzie Van Engelenhoven) is an American author of books for children and young adults. She writes both fiction and non-fiction about topics including sexuality and the role of women throughout history.

Life and career 
Lee has a Master of Fine Arts from Simmons University in writing for children and young adults.

Lee's first book, 2015's This Monstrous Thing, was a retelling of Frankenstein and earned Lee the Susan P. Bloom Children's Book Discovery Award. In the promotional period for this book, she began posting on Twitter under the hashtag #BygoneBadassBroads, sharing biographies of notable women beginning with Mary Shelley. This project grew in popularity, and in 2018, Lee published Bygone Badass Broads: 52 Forgotten Women Who Changed the World.

Her second novel, entitled The Gentleman's Guide to Vice and Virtue, was a New York Times Best Seller and earned a Stonewall Book Award for its portrayal of a bisexual young man in 18th-century Europe. This novel led to a series of books featuring the Montague siblings and a diverse set of characters whose struggles are presented in an era that didn't necessarily respect diversity.

She has contracted with Marvel to write three historical fiction books featuring Marvel antiheroes, beginning with a story about Loki out in September 2019 under the title Loki: Where Mischief Lies.

She is openly bisexual.

Bibliography
 This Monstrous Thing (2015)
 The Gentleman's Guide to Vice and Virtue (2017)
 Bygone Badass Broads: 52 Forgotten Women Who Changed the World (2018)
 All Out: The No-Longer-Secret Stories of Queer Teens throughout the Ages (contributing writer) (2018)
 The Radical Element: 12 Stories of Daredevils, Debutantes & Other Dauntless Girls (contributing writer) (2018)
 The Lady's Guide to Petticoats and Piracy (2018)
 The History of the World in Fifty Dogs (2019)
 The Gentleman's Guide to Getting Lucky (2019)
 Loki: Where Mischief Lies (2019)
 Gamora & Nebula: Sisters in Arms (2021)
 The Nobleman's Guide to Scandal and Shipwrecks (2021)

References

21st-century American women writers
American women novelists
American young adult novelists
Simmons University alumni
American LGBT writers
21st-century American novelists